Calgary was a provincial electoral district in Alberta, Canada, mandated to return one to six members to the Legislative Assembly of Alberta from 1905 to 1913, and again from 1921 to 1959. The district largely encompassed the boundaries of the City of Calgary, and was revised accordingly as the city grew.

Calgary history

Boundary history

Electoral history
The first iteration of the Calgary provincial electoral district in Alberta was created in the 1905 provincial boundary distribution. The district was known in that first election as Calgary City. Prior to 1905 when Calgary was still part of the Northwest Territories there were two districts East Calgary and West Calgary, which were split from the original Calgary Northwest Territories district in 1894. Calgary district first came into existence when Calgary had a sufficiently large population to meet the requirements to elect members in the Northwest Territories in 1884.

The first election in the district was held with the provincial general election of 1905. The election saw Liberal Minister of Public Works William Cushing win election against Conservative leader Richard Bennett. Cushing was named to the Rutherford prior to the election.

The number of seats in Calgary was increased to two in 1909. In that election Bennett and Cushing both won election, each elector in Calgary had two votes to vote for each seat. Bennett resigned to run for federal office and a by-election was held in 1911 to replace him.

The district was abolished and broken up into three electoral districts in 1913. The riding's were South Calgary, Centre Calgary and North Calgary. In 1921 the Liberal government promised to bring in proportion representation. They did not and instead decided to combine the three Calgary districts and add two more seats. Voters had the option of casting up to five votes and the top five candidates were elected by plurality Block Voting). As previously under Block Voting, Calgary voters did not vote the straight party line and two Independent, two Labour and a Liberal MLA were elected.

The United Farmers of Alberta passed legislation in 1924 that changed both Edmonton and Calgary to Single Transferable Vote multi-member districts. The rest of the province had single member constituencies and used Alternative Vote, where vote transfers were conducted if the leading candidate did not have a clear majority of 50% on the first count.

The 1926 and 1930 elections saw Calgary elect all opposition candidates because the United Farmers government decided not to field any candidates there. Under Single Transferable Voting the number of spoiled ballots jumped sharply as a sizable number of electors continued marking ballots with an "X". Calgary's first STV election produced mixed representation with no party taking all the seats. The 1935 election saw Social Credit candidates sweep to power But Calgary again elected a mixture of SC and non-SC MLAs.

By the 1950s, Calgary and Edmonton had gone through significant growth.  arriving at the final results in both cities would take days and was complicated in terms of counting the vote transfers. The length in terms of names on the ballots was causing long line-ups at polling stations, with electors taking as long as 15 minutes to mark their preferences. However, Calgary's ballot in 1955 held only 23 names and the voter was under no dictate to rank all the candidates on the list.

In 1957 the Social Credit government passed legislation standardizing the electoral system to First Past the Post across the province. The government passed a separate redistribution bill that divided Calgary and Edmonton into single member districts. In Calgary those districts were Calgary West, Calgary Glenmore, Calgary Bowness, Calgary North East, Calgary South East, Calgary Centre and Calgary North. The last election held in the district, a by-election in 1957, was conducted under the first past the post method.

Party composition by date 1905-1913

Party composition by date 1921-1959

Members of the Legislative Assembly (MLAs)

Election results

1905 general election
The Calgary electoral district was created when Alberta became a province independent of the Northwest Territories in 1905. Calgary had previously had two seats when it was represented in the Legislative Assembly of the Northwest Territories. This change created controversy because Conservatives accused the Liberals of creating more seats in northern Alberta where their support and organization was stronger. The two riding's previously represented in the city were West Calgary and East Calgary.

The election was a three-way contest but was primarily a two-way race. Richard Bennett the Conservative candidate and party leader was a well known lawyer and former Northwest Territories MLA. William Henry Cushing the Liberal candidate had previously been a prominent Calgary municipal politician including serving as mayor. He also had a number of private enterprises in the building materials industry. Rounding out the field was labor activist and independent candidate Alex Macdonald.

The 1905 election was mired in controversy as election results see-sawed back and forth, claims of Conservative supporters being denied access to polling stations were made with supporters of Cushing having been found to run the polling stations. After the official results were released Cushing was declared the winner by 47 votes. Macdonald placed well behind in third place but still with a respectable showing taking close to 20% of the popular vote. The result in Calgary had been seen by the Conservatives as an embarrassing personal defeat for Bennett as the party got nearly shut out of office province wide. Bennett quickly resigned as leader and was replaced by Albert Robertson.

1909 general election
About 6000 voters cast votes in this election.

The 1909 Alberta general election saw a second seat added to the Calgary electoral district. The riding was not split however. Instead the members were elected by Block Voting with electors having the right to select up to two candidates on the ballots. Voters did not cast their votes solidly for the two candidates of their preferred party so members of two different parties were elected.

The Conservatives and Liberals ran a slate of two candidates each, while the Socialists fielded one. William Cushing Minister of Public Works decided to run for a second term in office. The other Liberal candidate was prominent medical doctor William Egbert.

The Conservatives ran former party leader Richard Bennett who had previously contested the district in 1905. Thomas Blow who was also a medical doctor rounded out the slate. Bennett was unanimously acclaimed at the party nominating convention held on March 1, 1909 despite not attending. The second spot on the slate was contested between Blow and J.A. Carson. The two candidates were left over from ten nominees who either had their nomination withdrawn for various reasons or the candidates themselves or refused to let their name stand.

The Socialist Party selected George Howell to be its candidate. Howell worked as the secretary for the Calgary Trades and Labor council. Howell was a surprise choice by the Socialist nominating convention as he had not been running for the party nomination.

The results of the election showed a roughly even split between the Liberals and Conservatives, although with each voter casting up to two votes, the picture is far from clear. Each major candidate received approximately a quarter of the votes cast. But it seems voters did not vote solidly for a slate. The leading candidate of the Liberals and Conservatives took more votes than their running mates, so in the end one of each party took the seats.  The Conservatives picked up one seat and the Liberal incumbent held his. 

SPC candidate Howell took more votes than the Calgary Labour candidate had taken in 1905. He received support from about 12 percent of the voters. Howell's candidacy was not much of a factor, but Howell kept either of the main parties from gaining a clear majority in the popular vote.

1911 by-election

1921 general election

Note:
Voters had the option of selecting up to five candidates on the ballot

1921 by-election

1923 by-election

Shortly after the 1923 by-election, a deputy returning officer Alexander Davidson was convicted for voting more than once during the by-election and sentenced to a year in prison and a $400 fine.

1926 general election
In this election for the first time Calgary elected MLAs through Single transferable voting.
In the First Count, the five top spots were held by two Conservatives, two Liberals and Parkyn.
Vote transfers elevated a DLP candidate to the top positions, while Liberal McClung did not receive many vote transfers and fell out of the top runners.
In the end, Calgary elected a balanced and mixed crop of MLAs - two Conservatives, a Liberal, a DLP-er and an Independent-Labour man.
About 80 percent of the voters saw their vote used to actually elect someone. About half the voters saw their first choice elected; the other 30 percent saw their vote used to elect someone they preferred over others.

 2nd, 3rd and 6th counts held to transfer surplus votes not needed by successful candidates elected in previous count.
 White and Parkyn elected without quota as they were last two candidates in the running with two seats remaining to be filled.

1930 general election
Five MLAs elected through STV

1933 by-election

The Canadian Labor Party Alberta branch nominated candidate Amelia Turner under their banner. The Co-operative Commonwealth executive decided to support and endorse her election campaign but did not nominate her as a candidate for the organization. Norman Hindsley ran as an Independent but was endorsed and supported by the Conservative party.

1934 by-election

Charles Jamieson was originally nominated as a Conservative candidate but left the party and changed to the People's Candidate banner midway through the election.

1935 general election

1940 general election

1944 general election

Note:
In the 1944 election, Canadian Forces personnel were given special ballots intended to track how they voted. Service vote results are only available for the 1st count.

1948 general election

1952 general election

1955 general election

1957 by-election

The October 1957 by-election held on October 2, 1957 was the last election held in the Calgary electoral district before it was officially split in 1959. This was the first election province wide since Single Transferable Vote was implemented in 1924 that First Past the Post was put to use. The changes were implemented in 1956 in An Act Representing Members of the Legislative Assembly.

The election was called after Progressive Conservative incumbent, Arthur Ryan Smith resigned to run in the 1957 Canadian federal election.

Five candidates offered themselves in the election. Social Credit ran high-profile lawyer Samuel Helman. During the campaign Premier Ernest Manning promised to promote Helman to Attorney General as soon as he was elected to the district. The Progressive Conservatives ran lawyer Ernest Watkins, who had arrived from England in 1952. Rounding out the field was Frank Bodie who ran on a Labor banner. Liberal candidate Reginald McCollough and Independent Cliff Harris who was running in the election to protest Alberta's liquor laws in force at the time.

The election proved to be low turnout with 35% of 117,000 eligible voters casting ballots in the election. Advanced turnout was very quiet with just 148 votes being cast. Ernest Watkins won with 43% of the vote and held the seat for his party. The race turned out to be a primarily two-way race, with the other three candidates finishing well back.

Plebiscite district results

1948 electrification plebiscite
District results from the province wide plebiscite on electricity regulation:

1957 liquor plebiscite

On October 30, 1957 a stand-alone plebiscite was held province wide in all 50 of the then current provincial electoral districts in Alberta. The government decided to consult Alberta voters to decide on liquor sales and mixed drinking after a divisive debate in the legislature. The plebiscite was intended to deal with the growing demand for reforming antiquated liquor control laws.

The plebiscite was conducted in two parts. Question A, asked in all districts, asked the voters if the sale of liquor should be expanded in Alberta, while Question B, asked in a handful of districts within the corporate limits of Calgary and Edmonton, asked if men and women should be allowed to drink together in establishments. Question B was slightly modified depending on which city the voters were in.

Province wide Question A of the plebiscite passed in 33 of the 50 districts while Question B passed in all five districts. Calgary voted overwhelmingly in favor of the plebiscite posting a super majority for the yes side. The district recorded a strong voter turnout, well above the province wide average of 46%.

Calgary also voted on question B1 to decide the issue of allowing men and women to drink together within the corporate limits of Calgary. Like question A, city residents also voted for mixed drinking with a super majority. Oddly question B1 experienced a slightly higher voter turnout than question A.

Official district returns were released to the public on December 31, 1957. The Social Credit government in power at the time did not consider the results binding. However the results of the vote led the government to repeal all existing liquor legislation and introduce an entirely new Liquor Act.

Municipal districts lying inside electoral districts that voted against the plebiscite were designated Local Option Zones by the Alberta Liquor Control Board and considered effective dry zones. Business owners who wanted a license had to petition for a binding municipal plebiscite in order to be granted a license.

See also
List of Alberta provincial electoral districts
Calgary, Alberta

References

Further reading

External links
Elections Alberta
The Legislative Assembly of Alberta
 Map of Calgary 1955

Politics of Calgary
Calgary